The 1962 Cork Senior Hurling Championship was the 74th staging of the Cork Senior Hurling Championship since its establishment by the Cork County Board in 1887. The draw for the opening round fixtures took place at the Cork Convention on 28 January 1962. The championship began on 8 April 1962 and ended on 14 October 1962.

Blackrock were the defending champions, however, they were defeated by Imokilly at the quarter-final stage.

On 14 October 1962, Glen Rovers won the championship following a 3-8 to 2-10 defeat of University College Cork in a replay of the final. This was their 19th championship title overall and their first in two championship seasons.

Christy Ring from the Glen Rovers club was the championship's top scorer with 10-12.

Team changes

From Championship

Declined to field a team
 Duhallow

Results

First round

Quarter-finals

Semi-finals

Finals

Championship statistics

Top scorers

Top scorers overall

Top scorers in a single game

References

Cork Senior Hurling Championship
Cork Senior Hurling Championship